Akhtyrsky Uyezd was an uyezd (district) in the Kharkov Governorate of the Russian Empire, Ukrainian State and Soviet Ukraine

History 

This uyezd was created on April 25, 1780 by order of the Empress Catherine the Great. Since September 1781, Akhtyrka got its own coat of arms.

The uyezd had one town (Okhtyrka) and consisted of 13 volosts.

In the early 1890s, construction of a chaussee began through the uyezd.

In 1895, Akhtyrka railway station was built.

By the Soviet administrative reform of 1923, the uyezd was merged with Bogodukhov uyezd into Bogodukhov okrug.

Demographics
At the time of the Russian Empire Census of 1897, Akhtyrsky Uyezd had a population of 161,243. Of these, 87.6% spoke Ukrainian, 11.3% Russian, 0.5% Belarusian, 0.2% Yiddish, 0.1% Polish and 0.1% German as their native language.

References

Sources 
 Ахтырка // Энциклопедический словарь Брокгауза и Ефрона : в 86 т. (82 т. и 4 доп.). — Т. 2А. СПб., 1891.

Uezds of Kharkov Governorate